Princess Oskar of Prussia, Countess of Ruppin (27 January 1888 – 17 September 1973) was a German aristocrat and the wife of Prince Oskar of Prussia.

Early life
Countess Ina-Marie Helene Adele Elise von Bassewitz was born on 27 January 1888 at Bristow, Mecklenburg, Germany, as the second child and the youngest daughter of Count Karl Heinrich Ludwig von Bassewitz-Levetzow (1855-1921) and his wife, Countess Margarethe Cäcilie Luise Alexandrine Friederike Susette von der Schulenburg (1864-1940).  Her brother was Count Werner von Bassewitz-Levetzow.

Marriage
On 31 July 1914 she married Prince Oskar of Prussia, son of Emperor Wilhelm II and his wife Augusta Viktoria of Schleswig-Holstein. Both the civil and religious ceremonies took place at Schloß Bellevue in Berlin, Prussia. Initially the union was considered morganatic, but on 3 November 1919 was decreed to be dynastic in accordance with the house laws of the royal house of Hohenzollern. Prior to her marriage, on 27 July 1914, Ina Marie had also gained the title Countess of Ruppin, and from 21 June 1920, was titled Princess of Prussia with the style Royal Highness. The couple had four children:

Prince Oskar Wilhelm Karl Hans Kuno of Prussia (12 July 1915 Potsdam, Germany – 5 September 1939 Poland); died in World War II.
Prince Burchard Friedrich Max Werner Georg of Prussia (8 January 1917 – 12 August 1988); married Countess Eleonore Fugger von Babenhausen on 30 January 1961, no issue.
Princess Herzeleide-Ina-Marie Sophie Charlotte Else of Prussia (25 December 1918 – 22 March 1989); married Karl, Prince Biron von Kurland on 15 August 1938, with issue.
Prince Wilhelm Karl Adalbert Erich Detloff of Prussia (20 January 1922 – 9 April 2007); married Armgard Else Helene von Veltheim on 1 March 1952, with issue. He was the last living grandchild of Emperor Wilhelm II; was the thirty-sixth Herrenmeister of the Order of Saint John (Bailiwick of Brandenburg).

Death
Princess Oskar of Prussia, Countess von Ruppin, died in Munich, Bavaria, on 17 September 1973.

References

Further reading
 Marlene A. Eilers, Queen Victoria's Descendants (Baltimore, Maryland: Genealogical Publishing Co., 1987), page 156.
 C. Arnold McNaughton, The Book of Kings: A Royal Genealogy, in 3 volumes (London, U.K.: Garnstone Press, 1973), volume 1, page 60.

External links

1888 births
1973 deaths
Bassewitz family
House of Hohenzollern
Morganatic spouses of German royalty
German countesses
Prussian princesses